Graham Haynes (born September 16, 1960 in Brooklyn, New York) is an American cornetist, trumpeter and composer. The son of jazz drummer Roy Haynes, Graham is known for his work in nu jazz, fusing jazz with elements of hip hop and electronic music.

Career
With aspirations to push jazz beyond its traditional boundaries, Graham Haynes' first foray into electronic music came in 1979 upon meeting alto saxophonist Steve Coleman. Together, they formed a band called Five Elements, which launched an influential group of improvisers called M-Base Collective. After the formation of his own ensemble – Graham Haynes and No Image – and the subsequent release of an album (What Time It Be?), Haynes would spend the balance of the 1980s studying a wide range of African, Arabic and South Asian Music. After a move to France in 1990, Haynes incorporated these far-off influences into his next two releases – Nocturne Parisian and Griot's Footsteps.

Haynes returned to New York City in 1993 to take advantage of the flourishing Hip-Hop scene; and the resulting album was the sample heavy Transition. After the release of yet another hybridized album – 1996's Tones For The 21st Century – Haynes discovered drum 'n' bass and began working with some of the genres finest DJs and producers in London and the U.S. This manifested in the release of 2000s BPM, a fusion of drum n' bass beats with the classical music of Richard Wagner.

Over the years, Haynes has kept busy with several critically acclaimed multimedia projects, composed the score for films Flag Wars and The Promise, and lectured at New York University, while receiving two nominations for the prestigious Alpert Award For The Arts. He has collaborated with artists such as Roy Haynes, Cassandra Wilson, Vernon Reid, Meshell Ndegeocello, The Roots, David Murray, George Adams, Ed Blackwell, Bill Laswell, Steve Williamson, Pharoah Sanders and Bill Dixon.

He was featured on Vijay Iyer's 2017 ECM album, Far From Over, and in 2021 released Echolocation, a collaboration with electronic musician Submerged (DJ).

Discography

As leader or co-leader
 What Time It Be (Muse)
 Nocturne Parisian (Muse)
 The Griot's Footsteps (Antilles/Verve)
 Transition (Polygram/Antilles)
 Tones For The 21st Century (Polygram/Verve)
 Organik Mechanix (ION)
 BPM (Knitting Factory)
 With a Heartbeat (with Pharoah Sanders) (Evolver)
 Full Circle (RKM)
 But You Can't, Can You? (live, Hardedge)
 Austere Geometry (live, Hardedge)
 Echolocation (as Graham Haynes vs Submerged) (Burning Ambulance Music)

As sideman
With Ed Blackwell
 What It Is? Ed Blackwell Project Vol. 1 (Enja, 1993)
 What It Be Like? Ed Blackwell Project Vol. 2 (Enja, 1994)
With Jaki Byard and the Apollo Stompers
 Phantasies II (Soul Note, 1988)
With Uri Caine
 Sphere Music (JMT, 1993)
With Steve Coleman
 Motherland Pulse (JMT, 1985)
 On the Edge of Tomorrow (JMT, 1986)
 World Expansion (JMT, 1987)
With Bill Laswell and Jah Wobble
Radioaxiom: A Dub Transmission (Axiom/Palm, 2001)
With David Murray
 David Murray Big Band (DIW/Columbia, 1991)
With Bobby Previte
Weather Clear, Track Fast (Enja, 1991)
With Vijay Iyer
Far from Over (ECM, 2017)

References

Post-bop trumpeters
Jazz trumpeters
American jazz trumpeters
American male trumpeters
1960 births
Living people
Musicians from Brooklyn
Verve Records artists
Muse Records artists
Antilles Records artists
Jazz musicians from New York (state)
21st-century trumpeters
21st-century American male musicians
American male jazz musicians
Knitting Factory Records artists
21st-century African-American musicians
20th-century African-American people